U.S. Route 201 (US 201) is part of the nationwide system of United States Numbered Highways.  It runs for   entirely within the state of Maine and is a spur route of U.S. Route 1. Its southern terminus is in Brunswick at US 1 and Maine State Route 24 Business.  Its northern terminus is at the Canada–US border near Jackman (a terminus it shares with Maine State Route 6), where it connects to Quebec Route 173.

Between Solon and its northern terminus, US 201 is known as the Old Canada Road National Scenic Byway.

Route description

US 201 begins in Brunswick along SR 24 Business (former SR 24) at an interchange with US 1. It follows the Kennebec River from Gardiner, Maine, to The Forks where it winds away from the river and runs up into the north woods mountains. The highway crosses the Appalachian Trail at Caratunk, Maine.

North of The Forks, US 201 climbs in elevation over Johnson Mountain and around Coburn Mountain near Upper Enchanted and Parlin Pond Townships. Before reaching Jackman, the road peaks at the Attean Pond Lookout, a popular rest area, before descending into town. The road continues through parts of Moose River and Dennistown before reaching the Armstrong-Jackman Border Crossing at Sandy Bay Township. US 201 and SR 6 ends as the highway crosses into Quebec, Canada and becomes Route 173.

A former alignment designated US 201A runs through the towns of Madison and Norridgewock.

History

US 201 follows old river trading routes of the Abenaki people. Parts of Benedict Arnold's expedition to Quebec took place along the route that today make up US 201. On June 15, 2000, the route was designated a National Scenic Byway.

US 201 used to be New England Interstate Route 20 (NEI 20) in the 1920s. The original 1922 plan had NEI 20 starting in Portland. The southern half was later shifted east to start in Brunswick (the realignment may have been done prior to actual signing of the route.) The southern end of the original NEI 20 is now SR 100 from Portland to Augusta.  The Brunswick end of the original NEI 20 intersected with NEI 1 (which is now US 1), which remained the southern terminus of US 201 until the construction of the US 1 freeway, at which point its terminus was moved to its current location on SR 24.

Since its designation in 1926, US 201 has only undergone one major realignment.  The original highway used to run through Norridgewock, Anson, and Madison on its way to Solon.  In 1954, US 201 was moved to a new eastern alignment which completely bypasses this area and the existing alignment was redesignated US 201A.  US 201 has also undergone various other minor route adjustments, but largely maintains its original 1926 routing.

Major intersections

Somerset County Alternate route 
U.S. Route 201 Alternate (US 201A) is the designation of a former alignment of US 201 in the towns of Skowhegan, Norridgewock, Madison and Anson. US 201A runs along the Kennebec River over its entire length.

The southern terminus of US 201A is at US 2, US 201 and State Route 104 in Skowhegan.  The northern terminus is at US 201 in Anson, a terminus it shares with State Route 8.

US 201A is also part of the Arnold Highway (named for Benedict Arnold), established in 1931 over the original US 201.

US 201A is completely overlapped with other routes due to various realignments of the routes signed over it.

Route description 
US 201A begins in Skowhegan just south of the Kennebec River, at an intersection with US 2, US 201, and SR 104 (which has its northern terminus here). US 201A begins overlapped with US 2 and the two routes proceed southwest along the southern bank of the river on the way to Norridgewock. Upon reaching town, the highway intersects with SR 8 and SR 139. SR 139 has its western terminus at this intersection while SR 8 northbound joins the concurrency. Just to the west, US 2 splits off to the southwest, while US 201A goes to the northwest with SR 8 in tow. US 201A and SR 8 are cosigned for the remainder of their lengths.

US 201A and SR 8 continue along the riverbank, turning north into Madison and intersecting with SR 43 and SR 148.  US 201A and SR 8 then turn west, joining the converging routes to cross the river as a four-route concurrency. On the west side of the bridge lies the town of Anson, where US 201A and SR 8 split to the north off SR 43 and SR 148, which continue west concurrently. The highway turns north along the west bank of the river into the village of North Anson, intersecting the eastern end of SR 234 before meeting SR 16 just to the north. SR 16 joins US 201A and SR 8, proceeding north along the river out of town, and eventually passing into Solon. Nearing the riverbank once more, SR 16 splits to continue north along the river, while US 201A and SR 8 turn northeast to cross the river. Both routes terminate at US 201.

Junction list

References

External links

U.S. Route 201's page on Byways.org
Endpoints of U.S. Highway 201

National Scenic Byways
01-2
01-2
201
2
Transportation in Somerset County, Maine
Transportation in Kennebec County, Maine
Transportation in Sagadahoc County, Maine
Transportation in Cumberland County, Maine